6-Methylisoxanthopterin (6MI) is a base analog for the nucleotide guanine. It is useful as a fluorescent indicator because unlike most other base analogs, quenching does not occur when it is incorporated into a double helix. In fact, it exhibits a 3 to 4-fold increase in quantum yield when it is incorporated into a duplex formation. This allows 6MI to be used to probe the dynamics of DNA or RNA helices using a technique such as fluorescence polarization anisotropy.

See also
5-Bromouracil

References

Nucleobases
Biomolecules